

Regular season

Season standings

Record vs. opponents

Notable transactions 
 May 29, 1945: Buddy Rosar was traded by the Indians to the Philadelphia Athletics for Frankie Hayes.

Roster

Player stats

Batting

Starters by position 
Note: Pos = Position; G = Games played; AB = At bats; H = Hits; Avg. = Batting average; HR = Home runs; RBI = Runs batted in

Other batters 
Note: G = Games played; AB = At bats; H = Hits; Avg. = Batting average; HR = Home runs; RBI = Runs batted in

Pitching

Starting pitchers 
Note: G = Games pitched; IP = Innings pitched; W = Wins; L = Losses; ERA = Earned run average; SO = Strikeouts

Other pitchers 
Note: G = Games pitched; IP = Innings pitched; W = Wins; L = Losses; ERA = Earned run average; SO = Strikeouts

Relief pitchers 
Note: G = Games pitched; W = Wins; L = Losses; SV = Saves; ERA = Earned run average; SO = Strikeouts

Awards and honors 

All-Star Game (note: rosters were named by Associated Press writers, but game was not played due to travel restrictions during World War II)

Lou Boudreau, Shortstop

Steve Gromek, Pitcher

Frankie Hayes, Catcher

Jeff Heath, Outfielder

Allie Reynolds, Pitcher

Farm system 

LEAGUE CHAMPIONS: Batavia

Notes

References 
1945 Cleveland Indians at Baseball Reference
1945 Cleveland Indians at Baseball Almanac

Cleveland Indians seasons
Cleveland Indians season
Cleveland Indians